Events in the year 1827 in India.

Events

Law

Births
3 December – Acharya Rajendrasuri, reformer in Shvetambar sect of Jainism (died 1906).

 
India
Years of the 19th century in India